The Award for Film of the Year is the highest honour given by the London Film Critics' Circle.

List of winners
Past winners are:

Multiple winning directors
The following directors have directed multiple award-winning films:
2 wins – Woody Allen (1985, 1990)
2 wins – Steven Spielberg (1994, 1998)
2 wins – Alexander Payne (2002, 2004)
2 wins – Joel and Ethan Coen (1996, 2007)
2 wins – Jane Campion (1993, 2021)

References

Awards for best film
F